Taitou (台头镇) could refer to four towns in China:

Taitou, Shouguang, in Shouguang City, Shandong
Taitou, Xiangning County, in Xiangning County, Shanxi
Taitou, Gaocun, in Wuqing District, Tianjin
Taitou, Jinghai County, in Jinghai County, Tianjin

See also 
 Taitō: alternate romanization of Taitou in Japanese